Oktyabrsky is an urban locality (an urban-type settlement) in Chunsky District of Irkutsk Oblast, Russia. Population:

References

Urban-type settlements in Irkutsk Oblast